A catalogue of known compositions by Johann David Heinichen was published in 1913 by Gustav Adolph Seibel. However, this is not a complete list, as another catalogue of instrumental works was published later by Günther Hausswald, and discrepancies exist between the two.

Orchestral works

Orchestral suites
 Seibel 205 \ Suite for 2 oboes & bassoon in G major (Hwv II:1)
 Seibel 206 \ Suite for strings in G major (Hwv II:2)
 Seibel 267 \ Tafelmusik in F major

Symphonies
 Seibel 207 \ Sinfonia in D major (Hwv IV:1)
 Seibel 208 \ Sinfonia in A major (Hwv IV:3)
 Seibel 209 \ Sinfonia in F major (Hwv IV:4)
 Seibel 210 \ Sinfonia in F major (Hwv IV:5)

Concerti grossi
 Seibel 211 \ Concerto grosso in C major (Hwv I:1)
 Seibel 213 \ Concerto grosso in G major (Hwv I:7)
 Seibel 214 \ Concerto grosso in G major (Hwv I:4 & 6) - Hausswald identified 2 versions of the concerto, one from 1715 in Darmstadt and the other from 1717 in Venice.
 Seibel 215 \ Concerto grosso in G major (Hwv I:3)
 Seibel 216 \ Concerto grosso in G major (Hwv I:5)
 Seibel 217 \ Concerto grosso in G major (Hwv I:2)
 Seibel 223 \ Concerto a quattro in D major (Hwv IV:2)
 Seibel 226 \ Concerto grosso in D major (Hwv I:14)
 Seibel 231 \ Concerto grosso in F major (Hwv I:15)
 Seibel 232 \ Concerto grosso in F major (Hwv I:17)
 Seibel 233 \ Concerto grosso in F major (Hwv I:20)
 Seibel 234 \ Concerto grosso in F major (Hwv I:18)
 Seibel 235 \ Concerto grosso in F major (Hwv I:19)
 Seibel 236 \ Concerto a quattro in B flat major
 Seibel 242 \ Pastorale in A major (Hwv III:21)
 Seibel deest \ Concerto a quattro in D major

Concerti for solo instruments

Violin concertos
 Seibel 224 \ Violin Concerto in D major (Hwv I:13)
 Seibel 239 \ Violin Concerto in E flat major (Hwv I:23)
 Seibel deest \ Violin Concerto in B flat major
 Seibel deest \ Violin Concerto in A minor

Flute concertos
 Seibel 219 \ Flute Concerto in G major (Hwv I:8)
 Seibel 220 \ Flute Concerto in G major (Hwv I:9)
 Seibel 221 \ Flute Concerto in E minor (Hwv I:11)
 Seibel 225 \ Flute Concerto in D major (Hwv I:12)

Oboe concertos
 Seibel 212 \ Oboe Concerto in A minor (Hwv VI:1)
 Seibel 227 \ Oboe Concerto in D major (Hwv V:3)
 Seibel 228 \ Concerto for oboe d'amore in A major (Hwv V:4)
 Seibel 230 \ Oboe Concerto in F major (Hwv I:16)
 Seibel 237 \ Oboe Concerto in G minor (Hwv I:21)
 Seibel deest \ Oboe Concerto in G major

Keyboard concertos
 Seibel 229 \ Harpsichord Concerto in F major (Hwv III:4)

Double concertos
 Seibel 218 \ Concerto for flute & violin in E minor (Hwv V:2)
 Seibel 222 \ Concerto for 2 oboes in E minor (Hwv I:10)
 Seibel 238 \ Concerto for oboe & flute in G minor (Hwv I:22)
 Seibel 240 \ Concerto for oboe & violin in C minor (Hwv I:24)
 Seibel 245 \ Sonata da chiesa for oboe & violin in G major (reworking of Oboe Concerto, Seibel 212)
 Seibel deest \ Concerto for 2 flutes or flute & oboe in D major

Chamber music

Solo sonatas
 Seibel 260 \ Flute Sonata in D major (Hwv III:2)
 Seibel 261 \ Flute Sonata in D major (Hwv III:1)
 Seibel 262 \ Flute Sonata in D major
 Seibel 263 \ Violin Sonata in F major (Hwv III:3)
 Seibel 265 \ Oboe Sonata in G minor (Hwv III:5)
 Seibel 266 \ Violin Sonata in C minor (Hwv III:7)

Duo sonatas
 Seibel 277 \ Sonata for oboe & bassoon in C minor (Hwv III:6)

Trio sonatas
 Seibel 243 \ Sonata for flute, oboe & continuo in G major (Hwv III:8)
 Seibel 244 \ Sonata for oboe, violin & continuo in G major
 Seibel 246 \ Sonata for flute, violin & continuo in G major (Hwv III:9)
 Seibel 247 \ Sonata for flute, bassoon & continuo in G major (Hwv III:10)
 Seibel 248 \ Sonata for 2 flutes & continuo in G major (Hwv VI:2)
 Seibel 249 \ Sonata for flute, violin & continuo in G major (Hwv V:1)
 Seibel 250 \ Sonata for flute, violin & continuo in G major (Hwv III:11)
 Seibel 252 \ Sonata for 2 flutes & continuo in G major (Hwv III:12)
 Seibel 253 \ Sonata for oboe, violin & continuo in D major (Hwv III:18)
 Seibel 254 \ Sonata for oboe, viola da gamba & continuo in C minor (Hwv III:16)
 Seibel 256 \ Sonata for flute, viola d'amore & continuo in F major (Hwv III:13)
 Seibel 258 \ Sonata for oboe, violin & continuo in C minor (Hwv III:14)
 Seibel 259 \ Sonata for 2 oboes & continuo in C minor (Hwv III:15)
 Seibel deest \ Sonata for violin, bassoon & continuo in D major

Quartet sonatas
 Seibel 251 \ Sonata for flute, 2 violins & continuo in G major (Hwv III:17)
 Seibel 255 \ Sonata for 2 violins, viola & continuo in D major (Hwv III:19)
 Seibel 257 \ Sonata for 2 oboes, bassoon & continuo in B flat major (Hwv III:20)

Works for keyboard solo
 Seibel 241 \ Fughetta for organ in D major (Hwv VII:1)
 Seibel 264 \ Harpsichord Sonata in F major (Hwv V:5)
 Seibel 268 \ Fughetta for harpsichord in D major
 Seibel 269 \ Larghetto for harpsichord in E flat major
 Seibel 270 \ Sarabande for harpsichord in F major
 Seibel 271 \ Loure for harpsichord in G major

Cantatas
 Seibel 137 \ Là, dove in grembo al colle in C major
 Seibel 138 \ Quanto siete fortunate in A major
 Seibel 139 \ Già la stagion novella in B flat major
 Seibel 140 \ Glori bell' idol mio in E major
 Seibel 141 \ PerchË mai si bruni siete in F major
 Seibel 142 \ Qual fugiamai quel core in F major
 Seibel 143 \ Per sveglia nove fiamme in D major
 Seibel 144 \ A increspar l'onda con l'onda in A major
 Seibel 145 \ Chi puo mirarui senz' adoravi in A major
 Seibel 146 \ Tu mi chiedi s'io t'amo in B flat major
 Seibel 147 \ Quando sciolto d'amor io mi credea in E flat major
 Seibel 148 \ Dal povero mio cor in C minor
 Seibel 149 \ Lascia di tormentarmi in A minor
 Seibel 150 \ Mia Climene adorata in E major
 Seibel 151 \ Lontananza tiranna che vate in E flat major
 Seibel 152 \ Bella te lascio addio giunia in E flat major
 Seibel 153 \ Doppo tante e tante pene in E flat major
 Seibel 154 \ Leggi bel Idol mio in B flat major
 Seibel 155 \ Sedea Fileno un giorno in B flat major
 Seibel 156 \ In riva al bel sebeto l'ontano in F major
 Seibel 157 \ D'Eurilla sempre amata in A major
 Seibel 158 \ Dove fiorito impero in G major
 Seibel 159 \ Usignolo che piangenda in A major
 Seibel 160 \ Mitilde mio tresor in C minor
 Seibel 161 \ Nel dolce tempo in A major
 Seibel 162 \ Nice se il tuo bel labro in B minor
 Seibel 163 \ Alla caccia dell'alme in D major
 Seibel 164 \ Sento là che ristretto in G minor
 Seibel 165 \ Voi ben sapete in G major
 Seibel 166 \ Rusceletto che vai scherzando in D major
 Seibel 167 \ Dimmi, o mio cor in C minor
 Seibel 168 \ Fosche tenebre e dense in F major
 Seibel 169 \ O deluse speranze in E flat major
 Seibel 170 \ Sei gentil, sei vezzosa in G major
 Seibel 171 \ Intorno a quella Rosa in F major
 Seibel 172 \ Tormento dell'alma amore in A minor
 Seibel 173 \ Delizie del mio core in G major
 Seibel 174 \ Lieve turba canoro in B flat major
 Seibel 175 \ Parto à te menzognero in D major
 Seibel 176 \ Ascolta, Eurillo, ascolta in D major
 Seibel 177 \ Più lucide, più belle in B flat major
 Seibel 178 \ O beato quel giorno in A major
 Seibel 179 \ Mio cor amante in A major
 Seibel 180 \ Se mai Tirsi mio bene in D minor
 Seibel 181 \ La dove al pado in Riva in A major
 Seibel 182 \ Or che stanco dal corso in grembo in G major
 Seibel 183 \ La bella fiamma o Tirsi in D minor
 Seibel 184 \ Luci voi siete quelle de all'alma in A major
 Seibel 185 \ Sele amene autri ambrosi in D major
 Seibel 186 \ Amo sospiro ed ardo in C minor
 Seibel 187 \ Io scherzo, io rido, io canto in G major
 Seibel 188 \ D'amante sventurato in E major
 Seibel 189 \ Dori vezzosa Dori in D minor
 Seibel 190 \ Non di Fillide il seno in A minor
 Seibel 191 \ Bella se puo gradite in G minor
 Seibel 192 \  in G minor
 Seibel 193 \ Di giubilo tutto abbrudo in G major
 Seibel 194 \  in A minor
 Seibel 195 \ Doppo lunga catena in D major
 Seibel 196 \ Il caro e bel piacer in G major
 Seibel 197 \ O giove eccelso in G major
 Seibel 198 \ Da più eccelsi pensieri in E minor
 Seibel 199 \ Deh taci crudele ingrata in D minor

Liturgical works

Masses
 Seibel 1 \ Mass No. 1 in D major
 Seibel 2 \ Mass No. 4 in D major
 Seibel 2a \ Missa brevis in D major (2nd version of Mass No.4)
 Seibel 3 \ Mass No. 6 in D major
 Seibel 4 \ Mass No. 8 in D major
 Seibel 5 \ Mass No. 9 in D major
 Seibel 6 \ Mass No.11 in D major
 Seibel 7 \ Mass No.12 in D major
 Seibel 8 \ Mass No. 7 in D major
 Seibel 9 \ Mass in D major (2nd version of Mass No.1)
 Seibel 10 \ Missa reformata in D major (arr. of Mass No.12 by Joseph Schuster)
 Seibel 11 \ Mass No. 2 in F major
 Seibel 11a \ Mass in F major (2nd version of Mass No.2)
 Seibel 12 \ Mass No. 3 in F major
 Seibel 12a \ Mass in F major (2nd version of Mass No.3)
 Seibel 13 \ Mass in F major (2nd version of Mass No.5)
 Seibel 14 \ Mass No. 5 in F major
 Seibel 15 \ Mass in F major (parts identical to Mass No.2)
 Seibel 16 \ Mass in F major (parts identical to Mass No.3)
 Seibel 17 \ Requiem in C major
 Seibel 18 \ Requiem in E flat major
 Seibel 50 \ Kyrie eleison in D major (arr. by Schuster)
 Seibel 51 \ Cum sancto spiritu in D major (arr. by Schuster)
 Seibel 52 \ In gloria Dei Patri in D major (arr. by Schuster)
 Seibel 53 \ Et vitam venturi saeculi in D major (arr. by Schuster)
 Seibel 54 \ Agnus Dei in D major (arr. by Schuster)
 Seibel 55 \ Kyrie eleison in D minor (arr. by Schuster)
 Seibel deest \ Credo in D major

Litanies
 Seibel 67 \ Kyrie eleison in D major (arr. by Schuster)
 Seibel 68 \ Kyrie eleison in D major
 Seibel 85 \ Litaniae pro Festo Santi Fr. Xaveri in E minor
 Seibel 86 \ Litaniae pro Festo Corporis Domini in E minor
 Seibel 87 \ Litaniae pro Festo Santi Fr. Xaveri in C minor
 Seibel 88 \ Litaniae pro Festo Corporis Domini in C minor

Cantatas
 Seibel 29 \ Cantata al Sepolcro di nostro Signoro in C minor
 Seibel 30 \ Cantata al Sepolcro di nostro Signoro in C minor

Canticles
 Seibel 89 \ Magnificat in G major
 Seibel 90 \ Magnificat in A major
 Seibel 91 \ Magnificat in F major
 Seibel 92 \ Magnificat in F major
 Seibel 93 \ Magnificat in B flat major
 Seibel 94 \ Magnificat in B flat major
 Seibel 95 \ Magnificat in B flat major
 Seibel 96 \ Magnificat in E flat major
 Seibel 116 \ Te Deum in D major
 Seibel 117 \ Te Deum in D major
 Seibel 118 \ Te Deum in D major

Psalms

Latin
 Seibel 26 \ Beatus vir in F major
 Seibel 27 \ Beatus vir in D minor
 Seibel 28 \ Beatus vir in E flat major
 Seibel 31 \ Confitebor in A minor
 Seibel 32 \ Confitebor in G major
 Seibel 33 \ Confitebor in G minor
 Seibel 34 \ Credidi in F major
 Seibel 35 \ De profundis in C minor
 Seibel 44 \ Dixit Dominus in F major
 Seibel 45 \ Dixit Dominus in F major
 Seibel 46 \ Dixit Dominus in D minor
 Seibel 47 \ Dixit Dominus in B flat major
 Seibel 48 \ Dixit Dominus in E flat major
 Seibel 64 \ In exitu Israel in A minor
 Seibel 65 \ In exitu Israel in B flat major
 Seibel 69 \ Laetatus sum in C major
 Seibel 70 \ Laetatus sum in D major
 Seibel 78 \ Lauda Jerusalem in C major
 Seibel 79 \ Lauda Jerusalem in D major
 Seibel 80 \ Lauda Jerusalem in F major
 Seibel 81 \ Laudate pueri in C major
 Seibel 82 \ Laudate pueri in G major
 Seibel 83 \ Laudate Dominum in F major
 Seibel 84 \ Laudate pueri in F major
 Seibel 97 \ Memento Domine David in G minor
 Seibel 98 \ Nisi Dominus in G minor
 Seibel 99 \ Nisi Dominus in C minor

Vernacular
 Seibel 36 \ Es lebet Jesus unser Hort in C major
 Seibel 37 \ Meine Seele erhebet den Herrn in C major
 Seibel 38 \ Ach, was soll ich Sünder machen in E minor
 Seibel 39 \ Warum toben die Heiden in D major
 Seibel 40 \ Einsamkeit, o stilles Wesen in F major
 Seibel 41 \ Heilig ist Gott der Herr in F major
 Seibel 42 \ Gegrüßet seyst du holdseelige Maria in B flat major
 Seibel 43 \ Gott ist unsere Zuversicht in G minor

Antiphons, hymns and motets
 Seibel 21 \ Quis accendet in G major
 Seibel 22 \ Alma Mater redemptoris in F major
 Seibel 23 \ Alma Mater redemptoris in E flat major
 Seibel 24 \ Ave Regina in E flat major
 Seibel 25 \ Beati omnes in G minor
 Seibel 49 \ Domine probasti me in E minor
 Seibel 56 \ Haec dies quam fecit in G major
 Seibel 57 \ Decora lux aeternitatis in C major
 Seibel 58 \ Te Joseph celebrant in A minor
 Seibel 59 \ Ave Maris Stella in F major
 Seibel 60 \ Jesu Redemptor omnium in F major
 Seibel 61 \ Pange lingua in D minor
 Seibel 62 \ Veni creator Spiritus in G minor
 Seibel 63 \ In convertendo in C major
 Seibel 66 \ Libavit eos exdipe in D minor
 Seibel 100 \ Domine Jesu Christe in A minor
 Seibel 101 \ Regina coeli in G major
 Seibel 102 \ Regina coeli in D major
 Seibel 115 \ Sanctus in D major
 Seibel 119 \ Regina coeli in B flat major

Lamentations
 Seibel 71 \ Lamentatio Jeremiae in Coena Domini I in C minor
 Seibel 72 \ Lamentatio Jeremiae in Coena Domini II in F minor
 Seibel 73 \ Lamentatio Jeremiae in Coena Domini III in F minor
 Seibel 74 \ Lamentatio Jeremiae per il Venendi Santo I in G minor
 Seibel 75 \ Lamentatio Jeremiae per il Venendi Santo II in C minor
 Seibel 76 \ Lamentatio Jeremiae per il Venendi Santo III in C minor
 Seibel 77 \ Lamentatio Jeremiae in F minor

Responsories
 Seibel 103 \ In monte oliveti in F major
 Seibel 104 \ Tristis est anima mea in F major
 Seibel 105 \ Ecce vidimus eum in F major
 Seibel 106 \ Amicus meus osculi me tradidit in A minor
 Seibel 107 \ Judas mercator pessimus in A minor
 Seibel 108 \ Unus ex discipulis meis in C major
 Seibel 109 \ Erat quasi Agnus innocens ductus in C major
 Seibel 110 \ Una hora non potuistis in G minor
 Seibel 111 \ Seniores res populi cruci eum fecerunt in C major
 Seibel 112 \ Omnes amici mei dereliquerunt in A minor
 Seibel 113 \ Sicut ovis ad occissionem ductus in G minor
 Seibel 114 \ Beata viscera Mariae Virginis in G minor

Occasional and theatrical works

Operas
 Seibel 120 \ Flavio Crispo 1720
 Seibel 121 \ Le passioni per troppo amore 
 Seibel 122 \  Mario

Arias for operas
 Seibel 123 \ Beleidigtes Hertz in A major
 Seibel 124 \ Walle mein erhitztes Bluth in C major
 Seibel 125 \ Unglücklich in der Liebe seyn in G minor
 Seibel 126 \ Dir Tugend und Jugend verknüpfet das Band in G major
 Seibel 127 \ Treu ist mir angebohren in B flat major
 Seibel 128 \ Gehe nur verwegner Schöner in E major
 Seibel 129 \ Ich will die Falschheit rächen in D major
 Seibel 130 \ Wann hohe Häubter loben in A major
 Seibel 131 \ Denke nicht verdammte Liebe in F major
 Seibel 132 \  in A major
 Seibel 133 \ Hertz und Füß eilt mit Verlangen in F major
 Seibel 134 \ Meine Lippen sind voll Lachens in D major
 Seibel 135 \ Bella donna e che non fa? in G major (fragment)
 Seibel 136 \ Eures Schönsten Augen-Licht in E flat major (fragment)

Serenatas
 Seibel 200 \ Diana su l'Elba
 Seibel 201 \ La Gara degli Dei
 Seibel 202 \ Zeffiro e Chori
 Seibel 203 \ Le notte di Nettuno e di Teti
 Seibel 204 \ Serenata di Moritzburg

Oratorios
 Seibel 19 \ La Pace di Kamberga
 Seibel 20 \ Passionsoratorium

Lost works
 Seibel 272 \ Starke Kirchen-Musiquen
 Seibel 273 \ Sonata for 6 violins
 Seibel 274 \ So con un vezzo
 Seibel 275 \ Various works mentioned in collections
 Seibel 276 \ Various works mentioned in Zerbst
 Seibel deest \ Mass No.10 in D major

References

Lists of compositions by composer
Baroque compositions